Arncliffe, an electoral district of the Legislative Assembly in the Australian state of New South Wales, was created in 1930 and abolished in 1941.


Election results

Elections in the 1930s

1938

1935

1932

1930

References

New South Wales state electoral results by district